Larry "Bubbles" Brown is a San Francisco based, deadpan, self-deprecating comedian and actor.  He started doing stand up in San Francisco in the early 1980s. He began appearing on numerous TV shows such as Evening at the Improv, Make Me Laugh and others and made his first appearance on Late Night with David Letterman in 1987.  He  appeared on the Late Show with David Letterman on July 25, 2008, setting the record for the longest time in between appearances (over 20 years). He is a regular at the San Francisco Punch Line, Rooster T. Feathers, and The Throckmorton Theater in Mill Valley. His debut album, "It's Gotta Get Better", was released on March 3, 2020, by You Lucky Dog Productions and FastLayne Comedy; exactly 39 years after his first open mic set at the Holy City Zoo.

References

External links
 Larry "Bubbles" Brown on Myspace
 
 Live Set on Youtube
SF Chronicle article Dec 2017

Year of birth missing (living people)
Living people
American male comedians
21st-century American comedians